The Vietnamese grading system is an academic grading system utilized in Vietnam.  It is based on a 0- to 10-point scale, similar to the US 1.0-4.0 scale.

Typically when an American educational institution requests a grade-point average (GPA) calculated on the 4 point scale, the student will be expected to do a direct mathematical conversion, so 10 becomes 4.0, 7.5 becomes 3.0, etc. This makes sense from a practical standpoint. In reality, however, it is completely inaccurate.

In the Vietnamese system, a score of ten is rarely given. In contrast, a 4.0 in a U.S. classroom is not unusual, nor is someone with a 4.0 GPA overall. According to the Research Center for Vocational, Technical and Higher Education under the Vietnamese Ministry of Education, someone with a 7.5 GPA will probably be in the top 10-15% of his or her class.

The practice of most Vietnamese colleges is not to provide official transcripts to other universities on behalf of their students. Students can request a signed and stamped original transcript from their school, and then have copies certified with a red stamp at a government office. Translation services are also available at such offices.

Grade conversion table 
Source: EducationUSA Vietnam, U.S. Embassy in Hanoi.

In practice, most U.S. universities used a standardized acceptance of A, B, C, D's only.  Thus any A+'s, B+, C+ will be down-convert to A, B, C respectively.

Standardized Table to Convert University GPAs

Credit hours

Some universities in Vietnam employ a system of standardized credit hours, which can translate directly over to the U.S. system.  Some instead simply note class hours of 15, 30, 45, 60 ... etc., in an arrangement which needs to be converted into credit hours by dividing class hours by 15.  Thus a 15-hour class is equivalent to 1 credit hours, a 45-hour class is equivalent to 3 credit hours.

Method of calculating GPAs

Most universities convert GPAs class by class.  Each class is evaluated for credit hour equivalency.  Each class grade point is evaluated according to the native Vietnamese system, converted to A, B, C, D, F, and the individual class grade is translated to the 4.0 system.  Then, one must multiply each class grade point by the number of credit hours for the respective class.  Finally, the points are totalled up, and divided by the total number credit hours, to arrive at the final GPA.

The original article can be found at the U.S. Embassy's Education USA office located at: 1st Floor, Rose Garden Tower, 170 Ngoc Khanh St., Hanoi, Vietnam

https://photos.state.gov/libraries/vietnam/8621/pdf-forms/VN-Grading-System.pdf

High school credit system

High schools seem to use a slightly modified GPA system, with higher criteria to receive the equivalent grading letter scale.  High school classes are standardized in most Vietnamese public schools, with the respective classes and Grade Point tables listed below.

References

Vietnam
Grading
Grading